Sevda Asenova (born 5 January 1985) is a Bulgarian boxer. She participated at the 2022 IBA Women's World Boxing Championships, being awarded the bronze medal in the minimumweight event. Asenova was the first and only person of her country to win a medal.

References

External links 

1985 births
Living people
Place of birth missing (living people)
Bulgarian women boxers
Mini-flyweight boxers
AIBA Women's World Boxing Championships medalists
21st-century Bulgarian women